{{Infobox comics creator
|name=Kate Evans
|image=
|image_size=220
|caption=
|birth_name=Kate Evans
|birth_date=
|birth_place=Montreal, Quebec, Canada
|death_date=
|death_place=
|cartoonist=y
|writer=
|notable works=Threads from the Refugee Crisis, Red Rosa
|influences=
|parents=
|website=}}
Kate Evans (born 1972) is a British cartoonist, non-fiction author and graphic novelist.

 Biography 
Kate Evans was born in Montreal, Canada, and raised in Surrey, England. She studied English literature at the University of Sussex in Brighton where she became involved in political opposition to the Criminal Justice and Public Order Act 1994. Here she became associated with the SchNEWS DIY activist publication, editing and contributing artwork to several of its annual editions. From 1995 to 1998 Evans dedicated herself to environmental activism, providing cartoon reportage from a tree house on the route of the Newbury Bypass for The Guardian newspaper. In 1998, Evans wrote, illustrated and published her account as Copse: the Cartoon Book of Tree Protesting.

Since 2000, Evans has produced a series of non-fiction graphic works on a variety of social and political topics. The Food of Love: your formula for successful breastfeeding has popularised attachment parenting techniques. Evans subsequently authored and illustrated the pregnancy and birth manual Bump: how to make, grow and birth a baby.Red Rosa: a graphic biography of Rosa Luxemburg, an account of the life and work of revolutionary socialist Rosa Luxemburg was shortlisted for the Bread and Roses Award 2016.

Evans returned to comics journalism with the book Threads from the Refugee Crisis, reportage from the Calais Jungle. Threads from the Refugee Crisis was awarded the John C. Laurence Award from the Society of Authors in 2016 and won the Broken Frontier Award for Graphic Non Fiction 2017. In 2018 it became the first graphic novel to be nominated for the Orwell Prize for Books.

Evans lives in Somerset, UK, with her spouse and two children.

 Publications 
 Copse: the Cartoon Book of Tree Protesting. Self-published, 1998. . With photographs by Adrian Arbib, Gideon Mendel, and Andrew Testa.
 Funny Weather: Everything you Didn't Want to Know About Climate Change but Probably Should Find Out. Brighton: Myriad, 2006. . With an introduction by George Monbiot.Weird Weather. Groundwood, 2007. Canada and USA edition. . With an introduction by Monbiot.Il clima furioso. Tutto quello che dovete sapere sui cambiamenti climatici. Italy: LIT - Libri in Tasca, 2013. .
 The Food of Love: your formula for successful breastfeeding. Brighton: Myriad, 2009. .
 Bump: how to make, grow and birth a baby. Brighton: Myriad, 2014. .
 Red Rosa: a Graphic Biography of Rosa Luxemburg. Verso, 2015. .
 Threads from the Refugee Crisis. Verso, 2017. .
 Don't Call Me Princess!. New Internationalist, 2018. .

 References 

 External links 

An excerpt from Threads at The Guardian"Kate Evans on Doomed Revolutionary and Political Dynamo 'Red' Rosa" at Vice''

British women cartoonists
Artists from Montreal
Writers from Montreal
British graphic novelists
20th-century British women artists
20th-century British women writers
Alumni of the University of Sussex
1972 births
Living people